Prosynthetoceras is an extinct genus of Artiodactyla, of the family Protoceratidae, endemic to North America. In appearance, Prosynthetoceras looked much like Syndyoceras, Kyptoceras, and Synthetoceras with three horns, one on the snout, and two above the eyes.

References 

Protoceratids
Serravallian extinctions
Miocene even-toed ungulates
Miocene mammals of North America
Aquitanian genus first appearances
Fossil taxa described in 1967
Prehistoric even-toed ungulate genera